Ragbeh (also known as Jeysh and Rogbā) is a village in Naseri Rural District, Khanafereh District, Shadegan County, Khuzestan Province, Iran. At the 2006 census, its population was 1,131, in 161 families.

References 

Populated places in Shadegan County